Edric Cecil Mornington Roberts (18 May 1892 – 20 December 1976) was an English journalist, poet, dramatist and novelist. He was born and grew up in Nottingham.

Working career
Roberts published his first volume of poems, with a preface by John Masefield, in 1913. He published his first novel, Scissors, in 1923 and by the 1930's was an established bestselling author. His work was translated into 12 languages. 

He worked as a journalist on the Liverpool Post during the First World War, initially as literary editor, then as a war correspondent. For five years from 1920 he edited the daily Nottingham Journal. In 1922 he stood for Parliament for the Liberal Party. In the 1930s he reviewed books for The Sphere.

During the Second World War, Roberts worked for Lord Halifax, UK Ambassador to the United States.

Despite a prolific output and the popularity of his writings in his lifetime, they are almost wholly forgotten. His novels have been criticized for thin plots and cardboard characters, padded out with travel writing.

Personal life
Roberts said that on coming of age he drew up a list of aims for his next 15 years, which included a solid career as a novelist, membership of Parliament, ownership of a country house and a London pied-à-terre, and marriage with two sons and a daughter. Some were achieved, but not the last. In private he claimed proudly to have been a lover of Laurence Olivier, Ivor Novello, Baron Gottfried von Cramm, Somerset Maugham, and Prince George, Duke of Kent. However, his autobiography is discreet: "I don't want any ," he said, adding he was "nauseated by the striptease school of writers".

In later life Roberts's creative industry was impressive, but he gained repute as a name-dropping bore, the Canadian writer David Watmough dubbing him as "an irascible old fart". According to an obituary, his main personal trait was "magnetic egocentricity" – so fascinated by himself and his doings as to succeed uncannily in conveying that fascination to others, even against their will. Roberts's life often resembled a 20th-century grand tour, strewn with places in the sun, grand seigneurs and charming hostesses, with him as a fastidious literary pilgrim.

Roberts settled in Italy in the early 1950s, living in Alassio and then for many years in the Grand Hotel, Rome. He was awarded the Italian Gold Medal in 1966.  He donated his papers to Churchill College, Cambridge in 1975. He died in Rome in 1976.

Works
Phyllistrata (1913)
Through the Eyes of Youth (1914)
The Youth of Beauty (1915)
Collected War Poems (1916)
The Chelsea Cherub (1917) novel
Twenty-Six (1917)
Charing Cross (1918)
Training the Airmen (1919)
Poems (1920)
A Tale of Young Lovers (1922) poetic drama
Scissors (1923) novel
Sails of Sunset (1924) novel
The Love Rack (1925) novel
Little Mrs. Manington (1926) novel
The Diary of Russell Beresford (1927) editor
Sagusto (1927) novel
David and Diana (1928) novel
Goose Fair (1928)
Indiana Jane (1929) novel
Pamela's Spring Song (1929) novel (@)
Goose Fair (1929)
Havana Bound (1930) novel
Spears Against Us (1930) novel (@)
Bargain Basement (1931) novel
Half Way: an autobiography (1931)
Alfred Fripp (1932) biography
Pilgrim Cottage (1933) trilogy: includes The Guests Arrive and Volcano (*)
The Pilgrim Cottage Omnibus (*)
Gone Rustic (1934) (*)
The Guests Arrive (1934) (*)
Volcano (1935) (*)
Gone Rambling (1935) (*)

Gone Afield (1936) (*)
Gone Sunwards (1936) (*)
Victoria, Four-Thirty (1937) novel (@)
They Wanted to Live (1939) novel (@)
And So to Bath (1940) (*)
A Man Arose (1941) poem on Winston Churchill
Letters from Jim (1941) editor
One Small Candle (1942)
So Immortal a Flower (1944)
The Labyrinth (1944)
And So to America (1946)
Eight for Eternity (1947)
And So to Rome (1950)
A Terrace in the Sun (1951)
One Year of Life (1952) memoir
The Remarkable Young Man (1954)
Portal to Paradise: an Italian excursion (1955)
Love Is Like That (1957)
Selected Poems (1960)
Wide Is the Horizon (1962)
Grand Cruise (1963)
A Flight of Birds (1966)
The Growing Boy (1967) autobiography (i)
The Years of Promise autobiography (ii)
The Bright Twenties (1970) autobiography (iii)
Sunshine and Shadow (1972) autobiography (iv)
Pleasant Years (1974) autobiography (v)
Wings poem
(*)=The "Pilgrim Cottage" books
(@)=The "Inside Europe" novels

References

Cecil Roberts (1935) Gone Rambling; p. 3

1892 births
1976 deaths
English male journalists
English memoirists
English male novelists
20th-century English novelists
20th-century English male writers
Writers from Nottingham
English LGBT writers
20th-century English LGBT people